Adolphe-Félix Cals (17 October 1810 – 3 October 1880) was a French portrait, genre, and landscape painter.

Life and work

Adolphe–Félix Cals was born into a poor family yet his parents attempted to prevent him from performing manual labor. He initially trained as an engraver under Jean-Louis Anselin who was a family friend. After Anselin died suddenly he went on studying engraving, first with Ponce, then under Bosc, before finally entering the atelier of Léon Cogniet. Cogniet tried to mentor Cals in the direction of a more 'popular' style although Cals disagreed. Cogniet argued that Cals style would hurt his career but Cals refused to give in. He parted company with his (neoclassical-influenced) teacher, owing to his teacher's lack of appreciation for the emerging impressionist movement in art.

His career did in fact suffer and it was until he was much older that he reached any level of success. He became critically acclaimed at the 1846 Salon, despite receiving no formal award. His most productive years ended up being the last ten of his life. He exhibited multiple pieces at the 1868, 1869 and 1870 Salons. In 1863, Cals exhibited at the "Salon des Refusés", alongside works by Monet, Degas and Pissarro. Art dealer Pierre–Firmin Martin, known as "Father Martin", liked his work, and Cals went on to paint portraits of Martin and his wife (now in the "Musée Eugène Boudin" in Honfleur). So began the next phase of his career; influenced by Jean-Baptiste-Camille Corot and Johan Barthold Jongkind, he worked in more subdued, less fawn-coloured tones, more closely matching the Impressionists without adopting the "purple-violet which some painters are flooding their paintings with"—as Victor Jannesson remarked in his book on Cals (see bibliography).

Having divided his time between Paris and Honfleur since 1871, he finally decided to settle down, in 1873, in Honfleur, a port in Normandy which was home to many painters, and has been called "the cradle of impressionism". A friend of Jongkind, he regularly visited the "Saint-Simeon Farm", an inn in Honfleur, famous as a meeting place for artists and writers, such as Claude Monet, Eugène Boudin and Baudelaire, as well as Jongkind himself.

Having settled, with his daughter, in Honfleur during the last decade of his life, Cals painted the harbor, the sea and its associated human life. At the invitation of Monet, he participated in the first Impressionist exhibition in 1874 and 1876, until 1881.

Cals died in Honfleur on 3 October 1880, aged 69.

Notes

References
Alexandre, Arsène. A.F. Cals: ou, Le bonheur de peindre (Paris: G. Petit, 1900).
Jannesson, Victor. Le Peintre A.-F. Cals (1810-1880) et son élève J.-A.-E. Bataille (1828-1911) (M. Bourges, 1913).

Attribution:
This article incorporates text from French Wikipedia, Adolphe-Félix Cals.

External links

 
Adolphe-Félix Cals online (Artcyclopedia)

1810 births
1880 deaths
19th-century French painters
French male painters
French genre painters
French landscape painters
French portrait painters
Painters from Paris
French Impressionist painters
19th-century French male artists